Pierre Monnerville (24 February 1895 in Cayenne, French Guiana – 6 September 1970 in Les Abymes, Guadeloupe) was a politician from French Guiana who belonged to the French Section of the Workers' International (SFIO) and served and represented Guadeloupe in the French National Assembly from 1956 to 1967. He was the mayor of Morne-à-l'Eau from 1947 to 1970.

References 
Monnerville's page on the French National Assembly website

1895 births
1970 deaths
People from Cayenne
French Section of the Workers' International politicians
Deputies of the 3rd National Assembly of the French Fourth Republic
Deputies of the 1st National Assembly of the French Fifth Republic
Deputies of the 2nd National Assembly of the French Fifth Republic
Mayors of places in Guadeloupe